FC Lokomotiv Stara Zagora is a Bulgarian football club from Stara Zagora, founded in April 1934 as ZHSK (ЖСК). The club currently competes in the fourth tier of Bulgarian football, A RFG Stara Zagora. FC Lokomotiv is the second celebrity football team from Stara Zagora. Its best achievement has been participating in the "B" group of football, the second tier of Bulgarian football.

History
Lokomotiv was founded in April 1934. It was named ZHSK until 1946, then Lokomotiv from 1946 to 1949, Energy in 1949, Torpedo from 1949 to 1950 and again from 1951 to Lokomotiv in 1959. In 1952. the team was steps away from entry into the "A" group. Lokomotiv was in the forehead on the "B" group (the elite come in the first five). After a 22-day round Lokomotiv is idvaden of primacy with Torpedo (Rousse). The reason – an incident with the audience during the game near the Danube. In 1959 Village Lokomotiv and Botev are united under the name Beroe. Although the organizational structure of entering Beroe, zheleznicharite retain their identity. In the summer of 1998, and with the participation of people from the Chairman of the Lokomotiv players and Askent from Gurkovo is formed Beroe 2000 (Stara Zagora). Along with Lokomotiv and Askent continue to exist. Two years later Beroe 2000, which in mid-1999 moved its headquarters and plays in Kazanlak, merged with "Lokomotiv Stara Zagora". In early July 2004. zheleznicharite merged with another local team – Union Beroe (Stara Zagora), founded in August 2000. Lokomotiv has 12 participations in the "B" group. Coach of the team of 2005 is the legendary Botev Plovdiv – Petar Zehtinski – Ziko.

Successes
 8-th place in the National Championships in 1937
 2-nd place in the South-east "B" group in 1956
 3-rd place in the South-east "B" group in 1954 and 1955
 6-th place in South "B" group in 1967
 7-th place in South "B" group in 1958
 8-th place in "B" group in 1951
* 15 holdings in "B" group.
 1/16-final participant for the National Cup in 1968/69 (then the Soviet Army Cup) and 2004/05

First-team squad

External links
 Official site

Defunct football clubs in Bulgaria
Lokomotiv
Lokomotiv Stara Zagora
1934 establishments in Bulgaria
Association football clubs disestablished in 2009
2009 disestablishments in Bulgaria